Ed Culpepper (born Robert Edward Culpepper) is a former defensive tackle in the National Football League. He played two seasons with the Chicago Cardinals before moving with the team to St. Louis, Missouri before the 1960 NFL season. Culpepper was later selected in the 1961 NFL Expansion Draft by the Minnesota Vikings and would play for the team during the 1961 NFL season. He would play his final two professional seasons with the Houston Oilers of the American Football League.

References

1934 births
Living people
Sportspeople from Bradenton, Florida
Players of American football from Florida
American football defensive tackles
Alabama Crimson Tide football players
Green Bay Packers players
Chicago Cardinals players
St. Louis Cardinals (football) players
Minnesota Vikings players
Houston Oilers players
American Football League players